The Beneteau 331 is a French sailboat that was designed by Group Finot/Conq for cruising and first built in 1999.

The Beneteau 331 has also been marketed as the Oceanis 331, Oceanis Clipper 331 and Moorings 332.

The design replaced the Oceanis 321 in the company's line.

Production
The design was built by Beneteau in France and in the United States, with 822 examples completed between 1999 and 2004, but it is now out of production. It was introduced in 1999 as a 2000 model.

Design

The Beneteau 331 is a recreational keelboat, built predominantly of solid fiberglass with the deck balsa-cored. It has a masthead sloop rig, aluminum spars, a deck-stepped mast, a raked stem, a walk-through reverse transom, an internally mounted spade-type rudder controlled by a wheel and a fixed fin keel, shoal draft keel or lifting keel.

The interior layouts vary, based on the model and role, but a typical layout has sleeping accommodation for four to six people, with a double "V"-berth in the bow cabin, two straight settees in the main cabin around a drop-leaf table and an aft cabin with a double berth. The galley is located on the port side just forward of the companionway ladder. The galley is "U"-shaped and is equipped with a two-burner stove,  icebox and a single sink. A navigation station is forward of the galley, on the port side. The head is located opposite the galley on the starboard side and includes a shower. A three-cabin layout was also available.

Variants
Beneteau 331
It was also sold with a shoal draft bulb keel and lifting keel with twin rudders.
Oceanis 331
A lifting keel with twin rudders was also offered. The boat is fitted with a Swedish Volvo diesel engine.
Moorings 332
Model with three cabins, for the yacht charter market.

Operational history

A review described the design, "the Beneteau 331 offers a sophisticated hull with traditional lines. A spacious cockpit, top-of-the-line deck hardware and a roller furling main accent her ease of handling. The 331 features lots of extras such as an optional retractable keel, standard refrigeration, improved ventilation and additional electronics."

See also
List of sailing boat types

Similar sailboats
Beneteau First Class 10
C&C 34
C&C 34/36
Catalina 34
Coast 34
Columbia 34
Columbia 34 Mark II
Creekmore 34
Crown 34
CS 34
Express 34
Hunter 34
San Juan 34
Sea Sprite 34
Sun Odyssey 349
Tartan 34 C
Tartan 34-2
Viking 34

References

External links

Detailed interior and exterior photos

Keelboats
1990s sailboat type designs
Sailing yachts
Sailboat type designs by Groupe Finot
Sailboat types built by Beneteau